The 2010–11 Huws Gray Alliance season began on 13 August 2010 and was originally scheduled to end on 2 April 2011. Due to adverse weather conditions, no league games took place between 12 December and the beginning of January, causing a lot of fixtures to be rearranged and creating the possibility of the season being extended. The season was eventually extended to 3 May 2011.

Teams

League table

Results

References

External links
 Huws Gray Alliance

2010–11
2